Knema mamillata is a species of plant in the family Myristicaceae. It is a tree endemic to Kalimantan in Indonesia.

References

mamillata
Endemic flora of Borneo
Trees of Borneo
Flora of Kalimantan
Vulnerable plants
Taxonomy articles created by Polbot